New York's 106th State Assembly district is one of the 150 districts in the New York State Assembly. It has been represented by Didi Barrett since 2013.

Geography 
District 106 contains portions of Columbia and Dutchess counties.

Recent election results

2022

2020

2018

2016

2014

2012

References 

106
Columbia County, New York
Dutchess County, New York